Placidus (also known as Placid) was a disciple of Benedict of Nursia.  He was the son of the patrician Tertullus, was brought as a child to Benedict at Sublaqueum (Subiaco) and dedicated to God as provided for in chapter 69 of the Rule of St. Benedict (oblate).

Life
Placidus was the eldest son of the patrician Tertullus.  When he was about eight years old, his father placed him under the care of Benedict at Subiaco, to be educated. Gregory the Great (Dialogues, II, vii) relates an account of Placidus being rescued from drowning by his fellow monk, Maurus, who, at Benedict's order, ran across the surface of the lake below the monastery and drew Placidus safely to shore. It appears certain that he accompanied Benedict when, about 529, he removed to Monte Cassino, which was said to have been made over to him by the father of Placidus.

Of his later life nothing is known, but in an ancient psalterium at Vallombrosa his name is found in the Litany of the Saints placed among the confessors immediately after those of Benedict and Maurus; the same occurs in Codex CLV at Subiaco, attributed to the ninth century.

Veneration
Placid is venerated on October 5 in the 2001 Roman Martyrology and on the same date along with Placid in the Proper Masses for the Use of the Benedictine Confederation.

Patronage
He is the co-patron of Messina along with the Madonna of the Letter, and is the official patron of Biancavilla, Castel di Lucio, Montecarotto, and Poggio Imperiale. Because a large portion of Easton, Pennsylvania's Italian community originally came from Castel di Lucio, Placidus is given particular veneration with an annual parade through South Side on the Sunday before Labor Day.  The Sunday after is the Feast of the Holy Cross, celebrated by immigrants from the neighboring town of Santo Stefano di Camastra.

References

Sources

External links

St. Benedict's Abbey - Benedictine Brothers and Fathers in America's Heartland
The Holy Rule of St. Benedict - Online translation by the Rev. Boniface Verheyen, O.S.B., of St. Benedict's Abbey
 Benedictine College - Dynamically Catholic, Benedictine, Liberal Arts, and Residential

6th-century deaths
Benedictine saints
Benedictine spirituality
Italian Benedictines
History of Catholic monasticism
Italian Christian monks
6th-century Christian saints
Medieval Italian saints
Year of birth unknown